Cheshmeh Davi (also Romanized as Cheshmeh Dāvī) is a village in Mishkhas Rural District, in the Sivan District of Ilam County, Ilam Province, Iran. At the 2006 census, its population was 71, in 13 families. The village is populated by Kurds.

References 

Populated places in Ilam County
Kurdish settlements in Ilam Province